Anti-consumerism is a sociopolitical ideology that is opposed to consumerism, the continual buying and consuming of material possessions.  Anti-consumerism is concerned with the private actions of business corporations in pursuit of financial and economic goals at the expense of the public welfare, especially in matters of environmental protection, social stratification, and ethics in the governing of a society. In politics, anti-consumerism overlaps with environmental activism, anti-globalization, and animal-rights activism; moreover, a conceptual variation of anti-consumerism is post-consumerism, living in a material way that transcends consumerism.

Anti-consumerism arose in response to the problems caused by the long-term mistreatment of human consumers and of the animals consumed, and from the incorporation of consumer education to school curricula; examples of anti-consumerism are the book No Logo (2000) by Naomi Klein, and documentary films such as The Corporation (2003), by Mark Achbar and Jennifer Abbott, and Surplus: Terrorized into Being Consumers (2003), by Erik Gandini; each made anti-corporate activism popular as an ideologically accessible form of civil and political action.

The criticism of economic materialism as a dehumanizing behaviour that is destructive to Earth, as human habitat, comes from religion and social activism. The religious criticism asserts that materialist consumerism interferes with the connection between the individual and God, and so is an inherently immoral style of life; thus the German historian Oswald Spengler (1880–1936) said that, "Life in America is exclusively economic in structure, and lacks depth." From the Roman Catholic perspective, Thomas Aquinas said that, "Greed is a sin against God, just as all mortal sins, in as much as man condemns things eternal for the sake of temporal things"; in that vein, Francis of Assisi, Ammon Hennacy, and Mohandas Gandhi said that spiritual inspiration guided them towards simple living.

From the secular perspective, social activism indicates that from consumerist materialism derive crime (which originates from the poverty of economic inequality), industrial pollution and the consequent environmental degradation, and war as a business.

About the societal discontent born of malaise and hedonism, Pope Benedict XVI said in 2008 that the philosophy of materialism offers no purpose for human existence, and in 2011 specifically attacked the commercialization of Christmas; likewise, the writer Georges Duhamel said that "American materialism [is] a beacon of mediocrity that threatened to eclipse French civilization".

Background

Anti-consumerism originated from criticism of consumption, starting with Thorstein Veblen, who, in the book The Theory of the Leisure Class: An Economic Study of Institutions (1899), indicated that consumerism dates from the cradle of civilization. The term consumerism also denotes economic policies associated with Keynesian economics, and the belief that the free choice of consumers should dictate the economic structure of a society (cf. producerism).

Politics and society

Many anti-corporate activists believe the rise of large-business corporations poses a threat to the legitimate authority of nation states and the public sphere. They feel corporations are invading people's privacy, manipulating politics and governments, and creating false needs in consumers.  They state evidence such as invasive advertising adware, spam, telemarketing, child-targeted advertising, aggressive guerrilla marketing, massive corporate campaign contributions in political elections, interference in the policies of sovereign nation states (Ken Saro-Wiwa), and news stories about corporate corruption (Enron, for example).

Anti-consumerism protesters point out that the main responsibility of a corporation is to answer only to shareholders, giving human rights and other issues almost no consideration. The management does have a primary responsibility to their shareholders, since any philanthropic activities that do not directly serve the business could be deemed to be a breach of trust.  This sort of financial responsibility means that multi-national corporations will pursue strategies to intensify labor and reduce costs. For example, they will attempt to find low wage economies with laws which are conveniently lenient on human rights, the natural environment, trade union organization and so on (see, for example, Nike).

An important contribution to the critique of consumerism has been made by French philosopher Bernard Stiegler, arguing modern capitalism is governed by consumption rather than production, and the advertising techniques used to create consumer behaviour amount to the destruction of psychic and collective individuation.  The diversion of libidinal energy toward the consumption of consumer products, he argues, results in an addictive cycle of consumption, leading to hyper-consumption, the exhaustion of desire, and the reign of symbolic misery.

In art, Banksy, an influential British graffiti master, painter, activist, filmmaker and all-purpose provocateur, has created satirical and provocative works about the consumerist society (notable examples include "Napalm", also known as "Can't Beat That Feelin'", an attack on Walt Disney Pictures and McDonald's, and "Death By Swoosh", directed at Nike). Working undercover, the secretive street artist challenges social ideas and goads viewers into rethinking their surroundings, to acknowledge the absurdities of closely held preconceptions. In an essay contained in his 2004 book Cut It Out, he writes, "You owe the companies nothing. Less than nothing, you especially don't owe them any courtesy. They owe you. They have re-arranged the world to put themselves in front of you. They never asked for your permission, don't even start asking for theirs." After 2003, Banksy wrote the New Yorker by e-mail: "I give away thousands of paintings for free. I don't think it's possible to make art about world poverty and trouser all the cash." Banksy believes that there is a consumerist shift in art, and for the first time, the bourgeois world of art belongs to the people. On his website , he provides high-resolution images of his work for free downloading.

Anti-Consumerism from a sustainability perspective also ties into the social and political understanding of the term, as ideas surrounding this perspective are rooted in sustainability efforts. Practicing anti-consumerism can mean voluntarily simplifying and minimizing one's lifestyle; this can be in efforts to exist more sustainably in a consumer culture. These lifestyle changes, which include choosing paper bags over plastic bags when shopping, are also in line with anti-corporate activism and green consumerism -- both large contributors to the ethical market.

Conspicuous consumption

In many critical contexts, the term describes the tendency of people to identify strongly with products or services they consume, especially with commercial brand names and obvious status-enhancing appeal, such as a brand of expensive automobiles or jewelry. It is a pejorative term which most people deny, having some more specific excuse or rationalization for consumption other than the idea that they are "compelled to consume". A culture that has a high amount of consumerism is referred to as a consumer culture.

To those who embrace the idea of consumerism, these products are not seen as valuable in themselves, but rather as social signals that allow them to identify like-minded people through consumption and display of similar products. Few would yet go so far, though, as to admit that their relationships with a product or brand name could be substitutes for healthy human relationships that sometimes lack in a dysfunctional modern society.

The older term conspicuous consumption described the United States in the 1960s, but was soon linked to larger debates about media influence, culture jamming, and its corollary productivism. 

The term and concept of conspicuous consumption originated at the turn of the 20th century in the writing of economist Thorstein Veblen. The term describes an apparently irrational and confounding form of economic behaviour. Veblen's scathing proposal that this unnecessary consumption is a form of status display is made in darkly humorous observations like the following, from his 1899 book, The Theory of the Leisure Class:

In 1955, economist Victor Lebow stated (as quoted by William Rees, 2009):

According to archaeologists, evidence of conspicuous consumption up to several millennia ago has been found, suggesting that such behavior is inherent to humans.

Collaborative consumption 
Collaborative consumption describes the way that consumers of a good engage in shared consumption either through temporary rentals or second-hand purchases. Anti-consumerism opposes the continuous consumption of material possessions in part because of the unsustainability that individuals who seek the experience of consumer culture without the desire of long-term possession.

Collaborative consumption is understood as anti-consumption by focusing on the temporary usage of the products, consumers are able to express sustainable attitudes with the intent of reducing natural resources by reducing direct consumption of a product or brand. 
Modern day creative destruction culture causes sustainability issues, and in order to mitigate them, a more collaborative mindset is necessary when it comes to consumption.

Consumerism and advertising
Anti-consumerists believe advertising plays a huge role in human life by informing values and assumptions of the cultural system, deeming what is acceptable, and determining social standards.  They declare that ads create a hyper-real world where commodities appear as the key to securing happiness.  Anti-consumerists cite studies that find that individuals believe their quality of life improves in relation to social values that lie outside the capability of the marketplace.  Therefore, advertising attempts to equate the social with the material by utilizing images and slogans to link commodities with the real sources of human happiness, such as meaningful relationships.  Ads are then a detriment to society because they tell consumers that accumulating more and more possessions will bring them closer to self-actualization, or the concept of a complete and secure being.  "The underlying message is that owning these products will enhance our image and ensure our popularity with others." And while advertising promises that a product will make the consumer happy, advertising simultaneously depends upon the consumer never being truly happy, as then the consumer would no longer feel the need to consume needless products.

Anti-consumerists claim that in a consumerist society, advertisement images disempower and objectify the consumer.  By stressing individual power, choice and desire, advertising falsely implies the control lies with the consumer.  Because anti-consumerists believe commodities supply only short-term gratification, they detract from a sustainably happy society.  Further, advertisers have resorted to new techniques of capturing attention, such as the increased speed of ads and product placements.  In this way, commercials infiltrate the consumerist society and become an inextricable part of the culture.  Anti-consumerists condemn advertising because it constructs a simulated world that offers fantastical escapism to consumers, rather than reflecting actual reality.  They further argue that ads depict the interests and lifestyles of the elite as natural; cultivating a deep sense of inadequacy among viewers. They denounce the use of beautiful models because they glamorize the commodity beyond the reach of the average individual.

In an opinion segment of New Scientist magazine published in August 2009, reporter Andy Coghlan cited William Rees of the University of British Columbia and epidemiologist Warren Hern of the University of Colorado at Boulder, saying that human beings, despite considering themselves civilized thinkers, are "subconsciously still driven by an impulse for survival, domination and expansion... an impulse which now finds expression in the idea that inexorable economic growth is the answer to everything, and, given time, will redress all the world's existing inequalities." He argues that consumerism is making these tendencies worse by encouraging consumption without limit.

Supporters of anti-consumerism often accuse advertising of attention theft, i.e. they believe it unjustifiably invades public areas, thereby imposing itself on people who consider its presence unwanted. American graphic designer Sean Tejaratchi expresses his resentment of this "ad creep" in a 1999 issue of his clip art zine Crap Hound: "Advertising increasingly invades my environment instead of letting me come to it on my own terms when I need it... The most powerful and well-funded methods of mass communication in history have been used to create a one-way, unending flow of shit into my life... In the twenty-eight years since I was born, I've been subjected to a stunning amount of advertising, and I don't recall anyone ever asking me if I minded."

Austrian economics

Austrian economic advocates focus on the entrepreneur, promoting a productive lifestyle rather than a materialistic one wherein the individual is defined by things and not their self.

Criticism
Critics of anti-consumerism have accused anti-consumerists of opposing modernity or utilitarianism, arguing that it can lead to elitism, primarily among libertarian viewpoints, who argue that every person should decide their level of consumption independent of outside influence. Right-wing critics see anti-consumerism as rooted in socialism. In 1999, the right-libertarian magazine Reason attacked anti-consumerism, claiming Marxist academics were repackaging themselves as anti-consumerists. James B. Twitchell, a professor at the University of Florida and popular writer, referred to anti-consumerist arguments as "Marxism Lite".

There have also been socialist critics of anti-consumerism who see it as a form of anti-modern "reactionary socialism", and state that anti-consumerism has also been adopted by ultra-conservatives and fascists.

In popular media
In Fight Club, the protagonist finds himself participating in terroristic acts against corporate society and consumer culture.

In Mr. Robot, Elliot Alderson, a young cybersecurity engineer, joins a hacker group known as society, which aims to crash the U.S. economy, eliminating all debt.

In the novel American Psycho by Bret Easton Ellis, the protagonist Patrick Bateman criticizes the consumerist society of America in the 1980s of which he is a personification. Later on he goes on a killing spree without any consequences, suggesting that the people around him are so self-absorbed and focused on consuming that they either do not see or do not care about his acts.

In the Pixar movie, WALL-E, earth is depicted in an apocalyptic state caused by the negative effects of human consumerism.

See also

 Anti-consumerists (category)
 Affluenza
 Anti-capitalism
 Brandalism
 Buy Nothing Day
 Conceptual detours of the shopping cart in art, design and consumerism
 Degrowth
 Détournement
 Downshifting (lifestyle)
 Ethical consumerism
 Freeganism
 Growth Fetish
 Mottainai
 Neoism
 Over-consumption
 Philosophy of futility
 Planned obsolescence
 Post-growth
 Slow movement (culture)
 Steady-state economy
 Waste picker
 The Zeitgeist Movement

References

Sources
 Bakan, Joel (2004) The Corporation.
 Elizabeth Chin (2001) Purchasing Power: Black Kids and American Consumer Culture University of Minnesota Press 
 Hertz, N (2002) Silent Takeover: Global Capitalism and the Death of Democracy. Arrow.
 
 Luedicke, Marius K, Craig J. Thompson and Markus Giesler. 2010. "Consumer Identity Work as Moral Protagonism: How Myth and Ideology Animate a Brand-Mediated Moral Conflict". Journal of Consumer Research. 36 (April).
 Monbiot, G (2001) Captive State: The Corporate Takeover of Britain. Pan.
 Schor, J. (2010) Plenitude, Penguin Press HC. 
 Zehner, O (2012) Green Illusions, University of Nebraska Press.

External links

Fifty Possible Ways to Challenge Over-Commercialism by Albert J. Fritsch, SJ, PhD
The Rebel Sell, This Magazine, By Joseph Heath and Andrew Potter
25 Years of Monitoring the Multinationals
The Story of Stuff by Annie Leonard
The Good Life: An International Perspective

 
Consumerism
Anti-corporate activism
Counterculture
Ethical consumerism
Social theories
Sustainability